Monsoon Gallery is the largest independently owned fine art gallery in the Lehigh Valley region of Pennsylvania.  Located in Bethlehem, Pennsylvania, it is known for its unique collection of established local, national and international artisans' works of art.

Artists Include

Alexandru Darida - Former Official Painter for the President of Romania, Nicolae Ceauşescu.

Herb Williams - Acclaimed mixed-media artist most noted for his sculptural works utilizing Crayola crayons.

Howard Finster - Highly respected folk artist known for his gospel inspired works of art.

Stanley Mouse - Psychedelic artist best known for his work on Grateful Dead album covers.

Salma Arastu - Hailing from India, her mixed-media works have been exhibited and collected around the world.

Art Director

The gallery is owned and operated by Ranjeet Solanki Pawar; member of the Bethlehem Fine Arts Commission and Former Co-Chair of Filmmaker Committee for 2004 SouthSide Film Festival.  His family had emigrated from India not long before his great grandfather, Chaudhary Charan Singh, became the Prime Minister of India in 1979.

References

External links

 New York Times Article on Bethlehem 
 Archived articles on Monsoon Gallery 

Bethlehem, Pennsylvania
Tourist attractions in Northampton County, Pennsylvania
Art museums and galleries in Pennsylvania